Schistura denisoni is a species of ray-finned fish in the stone loach genus Schistura described from the Bhavani river of Tamil Nadu.

References

D
Fish described in 1867
Taxobox binomials not recognized by IUCN